Clinidium validum is a species of ground beetle in the subfamily Rhysodinae. It was described by Antoine Henri Grouvelle in 1903. It is widespread in the Amazon Basin of Brazil with records from Amazonas, Pará, and Amapá states. Clinidium validum measure  in length.

References

Clinidium
Beetles of South America
Insects of Brazil
Endemic fauna of Brazil
Beetles described in 1903